The Louisville and Nashville Depot is an historic Louisville and Nashville Railroad depot located at 206 Henry Street in Milton, Santa Rosa County, Florida. It was built in 1909 on the site of the former Pensacola and Atlantic depot built in 1882 which burned down in 1907. In 1973, the station was closed, but partially restored with a 1976 Bicentennial grant.

On October 29, 1982, it was added to the U.S. National Register of Historic Places. In 1989, the depot was listed in A Guide to Florida's Historic Architecture.

Today the building is owned by the Santa Rosa Historical Society.

West Florida Railroad Museum
The West Florida Railroad Museum opened in the depot in 1989, and contains a collection of preserved railroad cars and railroad memorabilia from the L & N Railroad, Frisco Railroad and other railroads.  The type of railroad car displays include two dining cars, two former Pullman Company sleeper cars that were renovated into L&N baggage-dormitory cars, two caboose cars, a boxcar and a flatcar.  The museum also features a bridge tender's house from the Escambia Bay trestle bridge, and a section shed with motor car.

The museum sponsors two model railroad clubs: the West Florida Model Railroad Club and the Emerald Coast Garden Railway Club.

References

Gallery

External links

West Florida Railroad Museum (Official Website)
Santa Rosa County listings at National Register of Historic Places
 Florida's Office of Cultural and Historical Programs
 Santa Rosa County listings
 West Florida Railroad Museum
 HawkinsRails' WFRM page

Railway stations on the National Register of Historic Places in Florida
Milton
Milton
National Register of Historic Places in Santa Rosa County, Florida
Railway stations in the United States opened in 1909
Railway stations closed in 1973
1909 establishments in Florida
1973 disestablishments in Florida
Railroad museums in Florida
Museums in Santa Rosa County, Florida
Model railway shows and exhibitions
Transportation buildings and structures in Santa Rosa County, Florida